Oleksandr Lebedynets (Ukrainian: Олександр Лебединець (born on 8 August 1984 in Zolochiv, Kharkiv Oblast) is a professional Ukrainian football player. He started his career for Metalist Kharkiv-2 and played there from 2001 to 2002. During that period he occasionally played for the semi-professional team FC Lokomotyv Liubotyn. In 2003–2009 he played for FC Helios Kharkiv.

See also 
Football in Ukraine
List of football clubs in Ukraine

References

External links 
 Oleksandr Lebedynets at FC Gelios

1984 births
Living people
Ukrainian footballers
FC Metalist-2 Kharkiv players
FC Helios Kharkiv players
FC Prykarpattia Ivano-Frankivsk (2004) players
FC Arsenal-Kyivshchyna Bila Tserkva players
Association football defenders
Sportspeople from Kharkiv Oblast